EEE (2,4,5-triethoxyamphetamine) is a lesser-known psychedelic drug. It is the triethoxy analog of TMA-2. EEE was first synthesized by Alexander Shulgin. In his book PiHKAL, both the dosage and duration are unknown. EEE produces few to no effects. Very little data exists about the pharmacological properties, metabolism, and toxicity of EEE.

See also 
 Phenethylamine
 Psychedelics, dissociatives and deliriants

References 

Substituted amphetamines
Phenol ethers